Tham Pha Tha Phon Non-hunting Area is a non-hunting area in Noen Maprang District of Phitsanulok Province.

Geography
A creek flows into Lower Nan River.

Topography
The total hill area is 93%, of which 40% high hill slope area (upper-slopes, shallow valleys and hill tops) and 53% hill slope area (open slopes and small hills in plains). Plains count for 7%.

Flora
The non-hunting area features mixed deciduous forest (28%), savanna (35%) and agricultural area (37%).

Fauna
Mammals, there are 15 species from 15 families:

Birds, there are some 6 species from 6 families:

Reptiles

Location

See also
 List of protected areas of Thailand
 List of Protected Areas Regional Offices of Thailand

References

Non-hunting areas of Thailand
Geography of Phitsanulok province
Tourist attractions in Phitsanulok province
1983 establishments in Thailand
Protected areas established in 1983